Moncrieff Johnston Spear (September 24, 1921 – October 22, 2016) was an American diplomat.

Spear was born in New York and attended Cornell University (B.A. 1946) and George Washington University (M.A. 1952). He was a veteran, served with the United States Navy in World War II. After the war, in 1946, Spear joined the United States Foreign Service. He had assignments in Germany, the Philippines, Yugoslavia, Thailand and Vietnam. He was the United States Chargé d'Affaires ad interim in the Bahamas at the opening of the U.S. Embassy in 1973. He married Lois Stamey and had three children.

References

1921 births
2016 deaths
American diplomats
Cornell University alumni
George Washington University alumni
United States Foreign Service personnel
United States Navy personnel of World War II
American expatriates in the Bahamas
American expatriates in Germany
American expatriates in the Philippines
American expatriates in Yugoslavia
American expatriates in Thailand
American expatriates in Vietnam